Jan Zakopal (born 22 October 1977) is a Czech former football player, who played more than 100 times in the Gambrinus liga. He made one appearance for the Czech Republic U21 team, as well as numerous appearances at lower age groups. He announced his retirement from professional football in February 2008.

Personal life
Zakopal married Czech tennis player Klára Zakopalová (née Koukalová) in 2006.  Jan Zakopal and Klára divorced in January 2014.

References

External links
 
 http://www.osobnosti.cz/jan-zakopal.php

1977 births
Living people
Sportspeople from Zlín
Association football defenders
Czech footballers
Czech Republic under-21 international footballers
Czech Republic youth international footballers
Czech First League players
AC Sparta Prague players
FK Viktoria Žižkov players
SK Dynamo České Budějovice players
FC Viktoria Plzeň players